Diplosoma is a genus of tunicates belonging to the family Didemnidae.

The genus has cosmopolitan distribution.

Species
Species:

Diplosoma abbotti 
Diplosoma aggregatum 
Diplosoma antarcticum 
Diplosoma ata 
Diplosoma carnosum 
Diplosoma citrinum 
Diplosoma fecundum 
Diplosoma gelatinosa 
Diplosoma gemmifera 
Diplosoma glandulosum 
Diplosoma gumavirens 
Diplosoma handi 
Diplosoma hitatti 
Diplosoma lafargueae 
Diplosoma listerianum 
Diplosoma longinquum 
Diplosoma lukini 
Diplosoma marsupiale 
Diplosoma matie 
Diplosoma migrans 
Diplosoma modestum 
Diplosoma multifidum 
Diplosoma multipapillata 
Diplosoma multitestis 
Diplosoma ooru 
Diplosoma pannosum 
Diplosoma ponticum 
Diplosoma purpurea 
Diplosoma redika 
Diplosoma simile 
Diplosoma simileguwa 
Diplosoma singulare 
Diplosoma siphonale 
Diplosoma spongiforme 
Diplosoma translucidum 
Diplosoma tritestis 
Diplosoma unitestis 
Diplosoma variostigmatum 
Diplosoma velatum 
Diplosoma versicolor 
Diplosoma virens 
Diplosoma viscosum 
Diplosoma watanabei

References

Tunicates